Peter Cantor (died 1197), also known as Peter the Chanter or by his Latin name Petrus Cantor,  was a French Roman Catholic theologian. He received his education at Rheims, and later moved on to Paris, where, in 1183, he became Chanter (hence his name) at Notre Dame. Charters show Petrus Cantor as a man active in hearing cases, witnessing documents and participating in the business of the chapter of Notre Dame.
Petrus was elected dean at Reims in 1196, but died in the following year in the Longpont Abbey, some time after 29 January 1197. He commented on Old Testament and New Testament books. His work on the sacrament of penance is especially noteworthy. His work reflects Scholastic perspectives.

Medievalist Jacques Le Goff cites Cantor when locating the "birth of purgatory" in the 12th century, based on Cantor's use of the term purgatorium as a noun in 1170. John Baldwin's extensive study of Peter the Chanter and his circle underlines their social doctrines. Their teachings influenced the theological program of the Fourth Lateran Council.

Bibliography 
A group of Petrus' questions on the sacraments was compiled and published by Jean-Albert Dugauquier; see Summa De Sacramentis et Animae Consiliis', Louvain, Louvain University Press, 1954–1957.
Petrus Cantor wrote the book Verbum Abbreviatum'' which was edited by Georgius Galopinus and published in 1639. This work has been edited in the series Corpus Christianorum.

References

1197 deaths
Year of birth unknown
12th-century births
12th-century French Catholic theologians